Heinrich Georg Stahmer (3 May 1892 in Hamburg, Germany – 13 June 1978 in Vaduz, Liechtenstein) was a German diplomat and economist by training who was in charge of German–Japanese relations at the German Foreign Ministry. He was an aide to Foreign Minister Joachim von Ribbentrop (1938–1940), special envoy to Japan and ambassador to the pro-Japanese Reorganized National Government of China in occupied Nanjing (1940–1943), before becoming German Ambassador to Japan (1943–1945).

A native of Hamburg, Stahmer fought during World War I and earned both classes of Iron Cross.

Diplomatic career
In 1936, Stahmer took part in the negotiations for the Anti Comintern Pact between the German and the Japanese governments.

Throughout 1940, he worked for a German-Japanese alliance, and on August 13, 1940, he was able to notify the Japanese embassy in Berlin about the decision to conclude such a treaty. In September 1940, he took part in the negotiations leading to the conclusion of the Tripartite Pact. After the conclusion of the pact, Stahmer was sent to his next mission in Tokyo.

In October 1941, Stahmer was appointed as German ambassador to the collaborationist Chinese reorganised national government under Wang Jingwei, established in Nanjing by the Japanese occupation, and remained in that position until late 1942. According to Japanese diplomatic cables, Stahmer was "excited" for his new posting as ambassador to China, a posting that was confirmed by Hitler, and that he would seek to act in accordance with the interests of both Germany and Japan during his tenure in China.

In January 1943, he was appointed ambassador to Japan, and arrived in Tokyo from Nanjing on January 28, 1943. He remained in that position until the end of the war.

On May 5, 1945, as the German surrender was approaching, Stahmer was handed an official protest by Japanese Foreign Minister Shigenori Togo, accusing the German government of betraying its Japanese ally. After the surrender of the German government, the Japanese government broke off diplomatic relations with the German Reich on May 15, 1945, and Stahmer was interned and kept under arrest in the Fujiya Hotel in Hakone near Tokyo until the Japanese surrender in August 1945.

On September 10, 1945, following the Japanese surrender, he was placed under arrest by US authorities in Sugamo Prison in Tokyo, and in September 1947, he was returned to Germany, where he was interned until September 1948.

After his release, Stahmer became involved in business with Japanese companies. He died in 1978 at Vaduz, Liechtenstein.

References

Further reading
 Heinrich Stahmer, "Germany and Japan" The XXth Century, Feb. 1943 (journal published in Shanghai)

External links
 Time article mentioning Stahmer's nomination as Ambassador to Japan .
 Dickinson Magazine article on the German Embassy in Japan under Stahmer .
 Article about the Stahmer mission to Tokyo in September 1940 (in Japanese) 
 "Heinrich Georg Stahmer and Hiroshi Ōshima", Nippon News, No. 18. in the official website of NHK.

1892 births
1978 deaths
Diplomats from Hamburg
Ambassadors of Germany to Japan
Recipients of the Iron Cross (1914), 1st class
Recipients of the Iron Cross (1914), 2nd class